Eleazer Williams (May 1788 – August 28, 1858) was a Canadian-American clergyman and missionary of Mohawk descent. In later years he claimed that he was the French "Lost Dauphin" and was a pretender to the throne of France.

Williams was born in Sault St. Louis, Quebec, Canada, the son of Thomas Williams, and was educated at Dartmouth College. He published tracts and a spelling book in the Iroquois language, translated the Book of Common Prayer into Iroquois, and wrote a biography of Chief Te-ho-ra-gwa-ne-gen (Thomas Williams).

Missionary career

In 1815, Williams joined the Episcopal Church. In 1817, Bishop John Henry Hobart appointed Williams to be a missionary to the Oneida people in upstate New York.

In 1820 and 1821, Williams led delegations of Native Americans to Green Bay, Wisconsin, where they secured a cession of land from the Menominee and Winnebago tribes in the Fox River Valley at Little Chute and along Duck Creek. Historians have disputed the significance of Williams' leadership to this migration compared to that of the Oneida people themselves, including Oneida leader Daniel Bread. The following year Williams made his home there and was married to a Menominee woman named Madeleine Jourdain. In 1826 he was ordained a deacon.

In 1839 and afterwards, Williams began to make the claim that he was the French "Lost Dauphin". During the 1850s he openly became a pretender to the throne of France, but he died in poverty at Hogansburg, New York.

Williams was buried at Saint James' Cemetery in Hogansburg on August 28, 1858. In 1947, his remains and tombstone were moved to Holy Apostles Cemetery in Oneida, Wisconsin. His tombstone at Oneida indicates that he was a Freemason.

Legacy

It was later taken off the list of state parks and the house was burned. It remains designated as Lost Dauphin Park with the land remaining state owned. The flagstone foundation of the house remains visible.

Publications

Citations

References

External links

1788 births
1858 deaths
18th-century Canadian non-fiction writers
19th-century Canadian non-fiction writers
Canadian Christian religious leaders
Canadian Mohawk people
American Episcopal clergy
People from Green Bay, Wisconsin
History of New York (state)
History of Wisconsin
Dartmouth College alumni
American Freemasons
People from Franklin County, New York
Louis XVII impostors
18th-century Canadian male writers
19th-century Canadian male writers